is a Japanese footballer currently playing as a forward for Fagiano Okayama.

Career statistics

Club
.

Notes

References

External links

1997 births
Living people
Japanese footballers
Association football forwards
Chuo University alumni
J2 League players
Fagiano Okayama players